Chitinophagaceae is an aerobic or facultatively anaerobic and rod-shaped family of bacteria in the phylum Bacteroidota.

Genera

 Agriterribacter Lee and Whang 2020
 Arachidicoccus Madhaiyan et al. 2015
 Arvibacter Chaudhary and Kim 2016

 Aurantisolimonas Liu et al. 2018
 Chitinophaga Sangkhobol and Skerman 1981
 Cnuella Zhao et al. 2014
 Compostibacter Siddiqi et al. 2016

 Deminuibacter Wang et al. 2019
 Dinghuibacter Lv et al. 2016
 Edaphobaculum Cao et al. 2017
 "Edaphocola" Choi et al. 2019
 Ferruginibacter Lim et al. 2009
 Filimonas Shiratori et al. 2009
 Flaviaesturariibacter Kang et al. 2015
 Flavihumibacter Zhang et al. 2010
 Flavipsychrobacter Liu et al. 2018
 Flavisolibacter Yoon and Im 2007
 Flavitalea Wang et al. 2011
 "Foetidibacter" Pu et al. 2021
 "Ginsengibacter" Siddiqi et al. 2021
 Gynurincola Zhang et al. 2019
 Haoranjiania Zhang et al. 2016
 Heliimonas Leandro et al. 2013
 Hydrobacter Eder et al. 2015
 Hydrotalea Kämpfer et al. 2011
 "Ilyomonas" Chhetri et al. 2019
 Lacibacter Qu et al. 2009
 Mucibacter Kim et al. 2020

 Nemorincola Chaudhary et al. 2018
 Niabella Kim et al. 2007
 Niastella Weon et al. 2006
 Niveitalea Hyeon et al. 2017
 Panacibacter Siddiqi et al. 2016
 Paracnuella Wang et al. 2019
 Parafilimonas Kim et al. 2014
 Paraflavitalea Heo et al. 2020
 Parapseudoflavitalea Lawson et al. 2020
 Parasediminibacterium Kang et al. 2016
 Parasegetibacter Zhang et al. 2009
 Phnomibacter Siddiqi et al. 2021
 Pseudobacter Siddiqi and Im 2016
 "Pseudocnuella" Maeng et al. 2021
 Pseudoflavitalea Kim et al. 2016
 Puia Lv et al. 2017
 Rurimicrobium Dahal et al. 2017
 Sediminibacterium Qu and Yuan 2008
 Segetibacter An et al. 2007
 "Solibius" Kim et al. 2010
 Taibaiella Zhang et al. 2013
 Terrimonas Xie and Yokota 2006
 Thermoflavifilum Anders et al. 2014

Phylogeny
The currently accepted taxonomy is based on the List of Prokaryotic names with Standing in Nomenclature and the phylogeny is based on whole-genome sequences.

Notes

References

Bacteroidota